Eleni was a  cargo ship that was built in 1947 by Lübecker Flenderwerke AG, Lübeck, Germany. She had been laid down as Greifswald for Norddeutscher Lloyd. She was captured uncompleted in May 1945 and passed to the Ministry of War Transport (MoWT), being completed in 1948 as Empire Ely. In 1954, she was sold to a Liberian company and renamed Maribella. A sale in 1955 to West Germany saw her renamed Ganges. In 1959, she was sold to Greece and renamed Eleni, serving until she was involved in a collision in 1971. She was declared to be beyond economic and scrapped in April 1972.

Description
The ship was a  cargo ship. She was built in 1945 by Lübecker Flenderwerke AG, Lübeck.

The ship was propelled by a triple expansion steam engine. The engine was built by Danziger Werft, Danzig, Germany in 1944 and refurbished by Lübeck Flenderwerke in 1946–47.

History
Laid down as Greifswald by Lübecker Flenderwerke for Norddeutscher Lloyd, the ship was seized in an incomplete state by British forces in May 1945 and was passed to the MoWT. Empire Ely was launched on 7 November 1947. She was completed in 1948. Empire Ely was placed under the management of Common Bros Ltd, Newcastle upon Tyne. In 1949, management passed to Sir R Ropner & Co, West Hartlepool, Co Durham. Ropner's were given the option to purchase the ship. Although the name Swiftpool was allocated, the sale did not go through. Empire Ely was offered for sale by tender in February 1949, then lying at Leith, Midlothian, undergoing minor repairs. She had not been declared a prize of war at the time. Management passed to Maclay & MacIntyre Ltd, Glasgow in 1950 and then to Stott, Mann & Fleming Ltd, Newcastle upon Tyne in 1951. The rescue tug  towed her to Singapore.

In 1954, Empire Ely was sold to Maribella Navigazione SA, Monrovia, Liberia and was renamed Maribella. In 1955, she was sold to F A Detjen, West Germany and renamed Ganges. She was chartered to Deutsche Dampfschiffahrts-Gesellschaft "Hansa". Her port of registry was Hamburg and the Code Letters DHNX were allocated. In 1959, she was sold to the Compagnia de Navigazione Andria, Greece and renamed Eleni.

On 5 September 1971, Eleni was in collision with the Norwegian cargo ship Prinsesse Ragnhild in the Bay of Kiel. Although she proceeded to Gdynia, Poland under her own power, she was declared to be beyond economic repair. Eleni arrived at Santander, Spain in April 1972 for scrapping.

References

External links
Photo of Empire Ely from port
Photo of Empire Ely from starboard

1947 ships
Ships built in Lübeck
Empire ships
Steamships of the United Kingdom
Merchant ships of the United Kingdom
Steamships of Liberia
Merchant ships of Liberia
Steamships of West Germany
Merchant ships of West Germany
Steamships of Greece
Merchant ships of Greece
Maritime incidents in 1971